Rick Geary (born February 25, 1946) is an American cartoonist and illustrator. He is known for works such as A Treasury of Victorian Murder and graphic novel biographies of Leon Trotsky and J. Edgar Hoover.

Geary has won two awards from the National Cartoonist Society: a Magazine and Book Illustration Award in 1994, and a Graphic Novel award in 2017.

Biography
Rick Geary was born on February 25, 1946, in Kansas City, Missouri. Geary was initially introduced to comics readers with his contributions to the Heavy Metal and National Lampoon magazines. He has also created a number of postcards as well as illustrations for all kinds of publications. Perhaps his most widely circulated illustration is his logo for the audiobook publisher Recorded Books.

Geary's distinctive cartooning style evolved from his early imitations of Edward Gorey. His drawings typically consist of stark clean black lines against a white background, with a total absence of half-tone or shading. Even more distinctive is Geary's method of panel art. Most comics artists will draw several consecutive sequential panels of the same characters in the same setting. Geary, uniquely, almost never devotes two consecutive panels to the same locale or character. This creates a constant impression of jumping from one image to another.

Geary has drawn a variety of solo comic books and graphic novels for various publishers, including adaptations of Great Expectations, The Invisible Man and Wuthering Heights for the revived Classics Illustrated series and a kid-oriented Flaming Carrot spinoff. His most extensive project is his ongoing non-fiction comic book series, A Treasury of Victorian Murder, published by NBM Publishing. The series chronicles such 19th century criminals as H. H. Holmes, Lizzie Borden, Charles Guiteau and Jack the Ripper. In the series, he often uses literary devices characteristic of 19th century popular literature. For example, The Borden Tragedy is narrated through excerpts of a period diary, and The Fatal Bullet didactically contrasts the lives and morality of Guiteau and his victim, President James Garfield.

The National Cartoonist Society awarded Geary its Magazine and Book Illustration Award in 1994 and its Graphic Novel award in 2017.

Notable works
At Home with Rick Geary (1985) Fantagraphics Books
 Classics Illustrated, Berkley Publishing Group
 Great Expectations, adapted from the novel by Charles Dickens (1990) 
 Wuthering Heights, adapted from the novel by Emily Brontë (1990)
 The Invisible Man, adapted from the novel by H.G. Wells (1991)
Housebound with Rick Geary (1991) Fantagraphics Books
Cravan (2005) Dark Horse Books
Biography series: 
J. Edgar Hoover: A Graphic Biography (2008) Hill and Wang
Trotsky: A Graphic Biography (2009) Hill and Wang
The Adventures of Blanche (2009) Dark Horse Comics
 Louise Brooks, Detective (2015) NBM/ComicsLit

A Treasury of Victorian Murder 
Series, published by NBM/ComicsLit
A Treasury of Victorian Murder (1987)
Jack the Ripper (1995) about the unsolved 1888 serial murders by Jack the Ripper.
The Borden Tragedy (1997) about the 1892 murder of Andrew and Abby Borden and subsequent trial of Lizzie Borden.
The Fatal Bullet (1999) about the 1881 murder of James A. Garfield by Charles Guiteau.
The Mystery of Mary Rogers (2001) about the unsolved 1841 disappearance and murder of Mary Rogers.
The Beast of Chicago (2003) about the serial murders by H. H. Holmes during the 1893 World's Columbian Exposition.
The Murder of Abraham Lincoln (2005) about the 1865 assassination of Abraham Lincoln by John Wilkes Booth.
The Case of Madeleine Smith (2006) about the 1857 murder of Pierre Emile L'Angelier and trial of Madeleine Smith.
The Saga of the Bloody Benders (2007) about the Bloody Benders, a family of serial killers in rural Kansas operating between 1871 and 1873.

A Treasury of XXth Century Murder 
Series, published by NBM/ComicsLit 
The Lindbergh Child (2008) about the 1932 kidnapping of Charles Augustus Lindbergh Jr.
Famous Players (2009) about the unsolved 1922 murder of William Desmond Taylor.
The Terrible Axe-Man of New Orleans (2010) about the unsolved serial murders between 1918 and 1919 attributed to the Axeman of New Orleans.
The Lives of Sacco and Vanzetti (2011) about the controversial trial, conviction, and execution of Sacco and Vanzetti between 1921 and 1927.
Lovers' Lane: The Hall-Mills Mystery (2012) about the 1922 murder of Eleanor Mills and Edward Hall and subsequent high profile trial.
Madison Square Tragedy: The Murder of Stanford White (2013) about the 1906 murder of Stanford White by Harry Kendall Thaw.
Black Dahlia (2016) about the 1947 unsolved murder of Elizabeth Short, known posthumously as the Black Dahlia.

References

External links
Geary's official website
 NCS Awards

1946 births
Living people
Artists from Kansas City, Missouri
American biographers
Inkpot Award winners
American male biographers
American comics artists
American comics writers
American Splendor artists